Acmella alba is a species of plant belonging to the family Asteraceae. Common names include brede mafane, spilanthes, tingflower, toothache plant, electric daisy, and buzz buttons. The flowers and leaves contain spilanthol, a local anesthetic.

References 

alba